Sisters is a novel by Danielle Steel, published by Delacorte Press in February 2007. The book is Steel's seventy-first novel.

Synopsis
Candy, the supermodel, Tammy, a successful TV producer, Sabrina, an ambitious lawyer and Annie, the artist are four sisters who leave their successful lives to care for one another and their father after their mother is killed in a car accident and Annie' sight is taken from her.

The sisters move into a brownstone and try to rebuild their lives out of the ashes of a painful death. As each sister finds new purpose and new loves, they begin to learn that family is the most important thing in life and this revelation cements their bond forever.

Footnotes
http://www.randomhouse.com/features/steel/bookshelf/display.pperl?isbn=9780385340229

2007 American novels

American romance novels
Novels by Danielle Steel
Independence Day (United States) novels
Delacorte Press books